Eublemma recta, the straight-lined seed moth, is a moth of the family Erebidae. The species was first described by Achille Guenée in 1852. It is found in the United States from South Carolina to Florida and west to Texas. It is also found south to Argentina, on Cuba, Jamaica and Puerto Rico.

The forewings are light brown with a dark brown straight postmedial line, bordered distally by white. The hindwings are white with a yellow or brown terminal line.

The larvae feed on various plants in the family Convolvulaceae, including Ipomoea and Convolvulus species.

References

Boletobiinae
Erebid moths of South America
Moths of Central America
Moths of North America
Moths of the Caribbean
Moths of South America
Moths described in 1852